Suomen AsuntoHypoPankki is a Finnish bank specialized in mortgage lending. The parent company of Suomen AsuntoHypoPankki is The Mortgage Society of Finland, a building society established in 1860. The Mortgage Society has more than 10,000 members.

Banks of Finland
Banks established in 2002
Finnish companies established in 2002